Nordvorpommern ("North Western Pomerania") was a Kreis (district) in the northern part of Mecklenburg-Vorpommern, Germany. It was situated at the coast of the Baltic Sea, where it enclosed the city of Stralsund. Further to the northeast, separated from Stralsund and Nordvorpommern by the Strelasund, lies the island of Rügen, administratively part of the eponymous district. Other neighboring districts are (from east clockwise) Ostvorpommern, Demmin, Güstrow and Bad Doberan.

Geography
The coast is characterised by an elongated peninsula, the Darß. Between the Darß and the mainland there is a very shallow lagoon, which is a part of the Western Pomerania Lagoon Area National Park, just as the entire peninsula itself.

History
In history this region was the westernmost part of Pomerania. Until 1819 it was a Swedish, after that Prussian territory called Neuvorpommern.

Nordvorpommern District was established in 1994 by merging the three previous districts of Grimmen, Ribnitz-Damgarten and Stralsund. On 4 September 2011, it was merged into Vorpommern-Rügen.

Coat of arms

Towns and municipalities
The subdivisions of the district were (situation August 2011):

References

External links

 Official website 

Former districts of Mecklenburg-Western Pomerania